Alexandru Grosu can refer to:

Alexandru A. Grosu (born 1988), Moldovan footballer who plays as midfielder
Alexandru Sergiu Grosu (born 1986), Moldovan footballer who plays as striker